Karen Darabedyan (born December 18, 1986) is an Armenian-American professional mixed martial artist and the founder of KD MMA Training Center in Glendale, CA. He is best known for fighting in WEC's lightweight division. Darabedyan is a training partner of Karo Parisyan and Manvel Gamburyan. He had a 12-0 amateur boxing record before he began MMA.

Biography
Darabedyan is an Armenian mixed martial arts fighter who has positioned himself as a well-rounded athlete through diverse and extensive training. He began studying karate at the age of 5 and taekwondo at the age of 9, earning his black belt in both by age 18.

He began expanding his martial arts training in junior high by taking up boxing, kick boxing, judo and wrestling, earning a black belt in judo by age 16 and achieving a 12-0 amateur boxing record by 18. During high school, he claimed two judo state championship titles and placed third in the nation. At age 16, Darabedyan entered the world of grappling, placing 1st in the Intermediate Men's No-Gi Lightweight division at the 2004 Grapplers Quest West 5 and winning 1st place at under 189.9 pounds in the 2007 World Grappling Games Best of West.

Drawing on his diverse training, Darabedyan competed in his first mixed martial arts fight at age 18, claiming a win in the first round by KO. Since then, he has compiled a 9–4 record. Despite Darabedyan's strong judo and grappling background, he tends to favor keeping the fight on his feet and striking.

He trained with Gokor Chivichyan and Gene LeBell as well as Roma Kalantaryan at Main Event Gym in Glendale.

WEC career
He made his WEC debut by defeating former WEC Lightweight Champion Rob McCullough on November 18, 2009, at WEC 44.

Darabedyan lost via armbar to Bart Palaszewski on March 6, 2010, at WEC 47.

He then faced Will Kerr on June 20, 2010, at WEC 49. He lost the fight via submission in the first round.

Darabedyan was expected to face fellow WEC veteran Marcus Hicks on September 11, 2010, at Shark Fights 13 but Hicks was forced off the card with an injury. Instead, he faced Daniel Mason-Straus and lost the fight via unanimous decision.

Mixed martial arts record

|-
| Win
| align=center| 14–6
| Dave Terrel
| Decision (unanimous)
| Extreme Fighters MMA - Ready for War
| 
| align=center| 3
| align=center| 5:00
| Long Beach, California, United States
| 
|-
| Win
| align=center| 13–6
| Sam Liera
| Submission (rear-naked choke)
| Legacy Fighting Alliance 13
| 
| align=center| 2
| align=center| 1:46
| Burbank, California, United States
| 
|-
| Loss
| align=center| 12–6
| Christos Giagos
| TKO (punches)
| RFA 38: Moises vs. Emmers
| 
| align=center| 1
| align=center| 1:42
| Costa Mesa, California, United States
| 
|-
| Win
| align=center| 12–5
| Joe Condon
| Submission (guillotine choke)
| CXF 2 - Gold Rush
| 
| align=center| 1
| align=center| 1:12
| Studio City, California, United States
| 
|-
| Win
| align=center| 11–5
| Pablo Sabori
| Submission (guillotine choke)
| Lights Out / Bash Entertainment - Fight Night at Sportsmen's Lodge 5
| 
| align=center| 1
| align=center| 4:07
| Los Angeles, California, United States
| 
|-
| Win
| align=center| 10–5
| L. John Borges
| Submission (guillotine choke)
| NFA: Valley Invasion 4
| 
| align=center| 1
| align=center| 1:09
| Woodland Hills, California, United States
| Return to Lightweight
|-
| Loss
| align=center| 9–5
| Mike Brazzle
| TKO (punches)
| ShoFight 20
| 
| align=center| 1
| align=center| 4:15
| Springfield, Missouri, United States
| Welterweight
|-
| Loss
| align=center| 9–4
| Daniel Mason-Straus
| Decision (unanimous)
| Shark Fights 13: Jardine vs Prangley
| 
| align=center| 3
| align=center| 5:00
| Amarillo, Texas, United States
| 
|-
| Loss
| align=center| 9–3
| Will Kerr
| Submission (armbar)
| WEC 49
| 
| align=center| 1
| align=center| 1:20
| Edmonton, Alberta, Canada
| 
|-
| Loss
| align=center| 9–2
| Bart Palaszewski
| Submission (armbar)
| WEC 47
| 
| align=center| 1
| align=center| 4:40
| Columbus, Ohio, United States
| 
|-
| Win
| align=center| 9–1
| Rob McCullough
| Decision (split)
| WEC 44
| 
| align=center| 3
| align=center| 5:00
| Las Vegas, Nevada, United States
| 
|-
| Win
| align=center| 8–1
| Estevan Payan
| TKO (punches)
| Shark Fights 6: Stars & Stripes
| 
| align=center| 1
| align=center| 1:20
| Amarillo, Texas, United States
| 
|-
| Win
| align=center| 7–1
| Joe Camacho
| TKO
| Call to Arms I
| 
| align=center| 1
| align=center| 5:00
| Ontario, California, United States
| 
|-
| Win
| align=center| 6–1
| Tony Ferguson
| Decision (unanimous)
| All Star Boxing: Caged in the Cannon
| 
| align=center| 3
| align=center| 5:00
| Montebello, California, United States
| 
|-
| Win
| align=center| 5–1
| Saad Awad
| Decision (split)
| Gladiator Challenge
| 
| align=center| 3
| align=center| 5:00
| Los Angeles, California, United States
| 
|-
| Win
| align=center| 4–1
| Jared Papazian
| Submission (rear naked choke)
| Total Fighting Alliance 12
| 
| align=center| 1
| align=center| 1:36
| Long Beach, California, United States
| 
|-
| Win
| align=center| 3–1
| Anthony McDavitt
| Decision (unanimous)
| Long Beach Fight Night
| 
| align=center| 3
| align=center| 5:00
| Long Beach, California, United States
| 
|-
| Loss
| align=center| 2–1
| Koji Oishi
| Decision (unanimous)
| Plainum Fighting Productions - Ring of Fire
| 
| align=center| 3
| align=center| 5:00
| Manila, Philippines
| 
|-
| Win
| align=center| 2–0
| Luke Adams
| Decision (unanimous)
| EFWC - The Untamed
| 
| align=center| 3
| align=center| 5:00
| Anaheim, California, United States
| 
|-
| Win
| align=center| 1–0
| Joe Alvarado
| TKO
| California Xtreme Fighting 2
| 
| align=center| 1
| align=center| 2:06
| Upland, California, United States
|

See also
List of male mixed martial artists

References

External links
Karen Darabedyan - Official Website

1986 births
Living people
Armenian male mixed martial artists
Lightweight mixed martial artists
Mixed martial artists utilizing judo
Mixed martial artists utilizing taekwondo
Mixed martial artists utilizing karate
Mixed martial artists utilizing boxing
Mixed martial artists utilizing Brazilian jiu-jitsu
Armenian practitioners of Brazilian jiu-jitsu
Armenian male judoka
Armenian male karateka
Armenian male taekwondo practitioners
Armenian male kickboxers
Armenian emigrants to the United States
Armenian male boxers